A House clearance is the process of removing all of the household items from a property or from part of a property. Many people use a house clearance service because they need to remove a lot of items or are looking to clear garages, lofts, sheds and basements.

Some house clearances can take more than a day if there is a large amount of household furniture and effects, sometimes when the occupant has been suffering from OCD or compulsive hoarding syndrome.

Costs involved 
When a house is cleared there are many costs associated with the job and vary depending on the items cleared. Many councils across the UK operate a strict policy which must be adhered to.
Example items. These have to be cleared in a safe way.
     asbestos
     pesticides
     fluorescent tubes
     oils
     some paints
     some household and car batteries
     discarded electrical equipment like TVs and computer monitors, fridges and freezers
     discarded energy saving light bulbs (also known as CFLs)
     mattresses
     plasterboard
     car tyres
A standard house of 3 to 4 bedrooms with an average amount of household furniture and effects can cost anywhere between £650 and £1,500 on average but can vary considerably based upon various factors such as, parking difficulty, high rise flats with only stair access, and high volume content within the property.

There may be a garden clearance involved and this would incur additional charges.

Garages can sometimes have large quantities of toxic material such as paint and garden pesticides which will also incur additional charges.

The loft area can sometimes have large amounts of clutter and the house clearance company will have to take this into consideration when working out a quotation.

Some  Clearance companies will take into account any value in the contents and use this value to reduce the cost. It's worth shopping around.

The Directgov advises that these items are put into your car and taken to your local waste management centre; also known as a 'tip' or 'dump'.
Due to recent changes made at recycling centres nationwide there is now a charge for the disposal of plasterboard and mattresses, and these items have to be separated from the general waste. This extra charge has therefore been passed on to the client or person having a property cleared

Licensing 
It is a legal requirement that companies who operate a house clearance service be registered waste carriers with the Environment Agency. The home owner can obtain this license by asking the business who is quoting for the job to produce one, or you can  check the validity of the licence on the Environment Agency website.
In addition to licenses, you should check for public liability insurance and for other credibility indicators. One scheme in Lancashire for example is Lancashire County Council Trading Standards " Safe Trader Scheme.

References

Waste management